Sodium tert-butoxide (or sodium t-butoxide) is a chemical compound with the formula (CH3)3CONa (abbr. NaOtBu). It is a strong, non-nucleophilic base.  It is flammable and moisture sensitive. It is sometimes written in the chemical literature as sodium t-butoxide.  It is similar in reactivity to the more common potassium tert-butoxide.

The compound can be produced by treating tert-butyl alcohol with sodium hydride.

Reactions
One application for sodium tert-butoxide is as a non-nucleophilic base. It has been widely used in the Buchwald–Hartwig amination, as in this typical example:

Sodium tert-butoxide is used to prepare tert-butoxide complexes. For example hexa(tert-butoxy)ditungsten(III) is thus obtained by the salt metathesis reaction from a ditungsten heptachloride:
NaW2Cl7(THF)5  +  6 NaOBu-t  →  W2(OBu-t)6  +  7 NaCl  +  5 THF

Structure
Sodium tert-butoxide forms clusters in the solid state, both hexamers and nonamers.

Related compounds
Potassium tert-butoxide
Lithium tert-butoxide

References

Alkoxides
Reagents for organic chemistry
Non-nucleophilic bases
Tert-butyl compounds
Sodium compounds